Abdoul-Halimou Sama (born 28 July 2002) is a Togolese footballer who plays as a defender for Togolese Championnat National club ASKO Kara.

Club career 
Sama started his career with ASKO Kara in 2020.

International career 
In January 2021, Sama was given his maiden call up into the Togo national team by Jean-Paul Abalo as he was named on the Togolese squad for the 2020 African Nations Championship. He made his debut on 22 January 2021, after playing the full 90 minute in their second Group C match against Uganda which ended in a 2–1 victory for Togo. He went on and played whole match of the last group match against Rwanda which they lost. In March 2021, he was called up to the senior side by Claude Le Roy, as one of the 13 local-based players ahead of their 2021 AFCON qualifiers against Comoros and Kenya.

Honours 
ASKO Kara
 Togolese Championnat National: 2020–21, 2021–22
Individual

 Best Defender of the Season (Kara Region): 2020–21

Career statistics

International

References

External links 

 
 
 
 
 

Living people
2002 births
Association football defenders
Togolese footballers
ASKO Kara players
Togo international footballers
21st-century Togolese people
Togo A' international footballers
2020 African Nations Championship players